The men's long jump event at the 1994 Commonwealth Games was held on 24 and 26 August at the Centennial Stadium in Victoria, British Columbia.

Medalists

Results

Qualification
Qualification: Qualifying Performance 7.95 (Q) or 12 best performers (q) advance to the Final.

Final

References

Long
1994